The  is Japanese aerial lift line in Teine, Sapporo, Hokkaidō. The line is operated by Kamori Kankō, which also operates  resort around the line, including ski areas, an amusement park, and golf courses. Opened in 1974, the line mainly transports skiers in "winter" (from December to March). In "summer" (from May to October), the line operates only on Saturday and Sunday.

Basic data
System: Aerial tramway, 1 track cable and 2 haulage ropes
Cable length: 
Vertical interval: 
Maximum gradient: 31°47′
Operational speed: 5.0 m/s
Passenger capacity per a cabin: 42
Cabins: 2
Stations: 2

See also
List of aerial lifts in Japan

External links
 Sapporo Teine official website

Aerial tramways in Japan
Transport in Sapporo
Tourist attractions in Sapporo
1974 establishments in Japan